Kulekhani is a village development committee in Makwanpur District in the Narayani Zone of southern Nepal. At the time of the 1991 Nepal census it had a population of 2,972 living in 535 individual households. It is the location of the Kulekhani Dam.

References

Populated places in Makwanpur District